The Einstein Cross (Q2237+030 or QSO 2237+0305) is a gravitationally lensed quasar that sits directly behind the centre of the galaxy ZW 2237+030, called Huchra's Lens. Four images of the same distant quasar (plus one in the centre, too dim to see) appear in the middle of the foreground galaxy due to strong gravitational lensing. This system was discovered by John Huchra and coworkers in 1985, although at the time they only detected that there was a quasar behind a galaxy based on differing redshifts and did not resolve the four separate images of the quasar.

While gravitationally lensed light sources are often shaped into an Einstein ring, due to the elongated shape of the lensing galaxy and the quasar being off-centre, the images form a peculiar cross-shape instead.

Other "Einstein crosses" have been discovered (see image below of one of them).

Details
The quasar's redshift indicates that it is located about 8 billion light years from Earth, while the lensing galaxy is at a distance of 400 million light years.
The apparent dimensions of the entire foreground galaxy are 0.87 × 0.34 arcminutes, while the apparent dimension of the cross in its centre accounts for only 1.6 × 1.6 arcseconds.

The individual images are labelled A through D (i.e. QSO 2237+0305 A), the lensing galaxy is sometimes referred to as QSO 2237+0305 G.

Gallery

See also 

 Cloverleaf Quasar
 Einstein ring (Chwolson ring)
 Gravitational lensing
 Quasar
 SN Refsdal
 Twin Quasar

References

External links 
 Simbad
 Information about Einstein's Cross on Skyhound.com
 Einstein's Cross core
 Einstein's Cross by Jay Reynolds Freeman
 Photo of the Einstein Cross at Astronomy Picture of the Day (March 11, 2007)
Google Sky

Gravitationally lensed quasars
Gravitational lensing
Pegasus (constellation)
69457
Albert Einstein